The three Waltzes, Op. 34, were composed by Frédéric Chopin from 1834 until 1838 and published in 1838.

Waltz in A-flat major, Op. 34 No. 1 

Being among the longest of Chopin's waltzes, this waltz is in A-flat major. The piece is introduced with a fanfare before modulating to D-flat major for a dreamy middle section. The A-flat material is succeeded by a coda, which leads to the end of the piece. This waltz was dedicated to Josefina von Thun-Hohenstein.

Waltz in A minor, Op. 34 No. 2 

This waltz is a sorrowful, slow waltz in A minor. Although it was the first to be written out of the three, the waltz was the second to be published. The Fryderyk Chopin Institute believes this piece was composed in 1831.

Waltz in F major, Op. 34 No. 3 

This waltz in F major, a typical Grande valse brillante, was composed in 1838 and published in the same year.

See also 
 Waltzes (Chopin)
 List of compositions by Frédéric Chopin by genre
 List of compositions by Frédéric Chopin by opus number

References

External links 

Waltzes by Frédéric Chopin
1838 compositions
Music with dedications